Al Oyoon FC is a football team in Saudi Arabia, founded in 1976. It is based in the city of the same name in the Eastern Province of the country.

Football clubs in Saudi Arabia